Ferdinand Schörner (12 June 1892 – 2 July 1973) was a German military commander who held the rank of Generalfeldmarschall in the Wehrmacht of Nazi Germany during World War II. He commanded several army groups and was the last Commander-in-chief of the German Army.

Schörner is commonly represented in historical literature as a simple disciplinarian and a slavish devotee of Adolf Hitler's defensive orders, after Germany lost the initiative in the second half of World War II in 1942/43. More recent research by American historian Howard Davis Grier and German historian Karl-Heinz Frieser depicts Schörner as a talented commander with "astonishing" organizational ability in managing an army group of 500,000 men during the fighting in late 1944 on the Eastern Front. He was harsh against superiors as well as subordinates and carried out operations on his own authority against Hitler's orders when he considered it necessary, such as the evacuation of the Sõrve Peninsula.

Schörner was a dedicated Nazi and became well known for his ruthlessness. By the end of World War II, he was Hitler's favourite commander. Following the war he was convicted of war crimes by courts in the Soviet Union, and West Germany, and was imprisoned in the Soviet Union, East Germany and West Germany. At his death in 1973 he was the last living German field marshal.

Early life

Schörner was born on 12 June 1892 in Munich, Kingdom of Bavaria, German Empire. He entered the Bavarian Army in October 1911 as a one-year volunteer with the Bavarian Leib Regiment, and by November 1914 he was a Leutnant der Reserve. Serving in World War I, he was awarded the Pour le Mérite military order as a lieutenant when he took part in the Battle of Caporetto, which shattered the Italian lines in autumn 1917. Continuing in the Reichsheer, between the two wars, Schörner served as a staff officer and instructor. In 1923 he was adjutant to General Otto von Lossow, the commander of Wehrkreis VII (military district) in Munich and participated in the defeat of the Beer Hall Putsch.

World War II
Schörner commanded the 98th Mountain Regiment in the invasion of Poland in 1939. During the 1941 Balkans campaign, he commanded the German 6th Mountain Division and earned the Knight's Cross for his role in breaching the Metaxas Line. With this division, Schörner took part in Operation Barbarossa in June 1941. The 6th Gebirgs Division was assigned to the Arctic sectors in the Eastern Front. In 1942 as a General der Gebirgstruppe he took command of the XIX Mountain Corps, part of the German Army in Finland. With this command he participated in the failed attack on Murmansk and the stalemate war that followed. Schörner's task was to keep the Pechenga Nickel Works in German hands. When the Soviets opened an offensive against the Arctic sector, the division took part in the fighting. In February 1942, Schörner was promoted to the rank of Generalleutnant, commanding the Mountain Corps Norway.

He later commanded the XXXX Panzer Corps on the Eastern Front from November 1943 to January 1944. In March 1944 he was made commander of Army Group A, and in May commander of Army Group South Ukraine. After stating that the Crimean port of Sevastopol could be held for a long time even if Crimea fell, he changed his mind and against Hitler's wishes, evacuated the Black Sea port. This retreat occurred too late and the German–Romanian 17th Army that was holding Crimea suffered severe losses, with many men killed or captured while waiting on the piers to be evacuated. During the late spring of 1944, Schörner oversaw the retreat from the Dniester River in Romania.

Schörner was promoted to the rank of Generaloberst in May 1944. In July he became commander of Army Group North, which was later renamed Army Group Courland, where he stayed until January 1945 when he was made commander of Army Group Centre, defending Czechoslovakia and the upper reaches of the River Oder. He became a favorite of high-level Nazi leaders such as Joseph Goebbels, whose diary entries from March and April 1945 have many words of praise for Schörner and his methods. On 5 April 1945, Schörner was promoted to field marshal and was named as the new commander-in-chief of the German Army High Command (OKH, Oberkommando des Heeres) in Hitler's last testament. He nominally served in this post until the surrender of the Third Reich on 8 May 1945 but continued to command his army group, since no staff was available to him. He did not have any discernible influence in the final days of the Reich.

On 7 May, the day General Alfred Jodl, Chief-of-Staff of the OKW was negotiating the surrender of all German forces at SHAEF, the last the OKW had heard from Schörner was on 2 May. He had reported he intended to fight his way west and surrender his army group to the Americans. On 8 May, OKW colonel Wilhelm Meyer-Detring was escorted through the American lines to contact Schörner. The colonel reported that Schörner had ordered his operational command to observe the surrender but he could not guarantee that he would be obeyed everywhere. Schörner ordered a continuation of fighting against Red Army and the Czech insurgents of the Prague uprising. Later that day, Schörner deserted and flew to Austria, where he was arrested by the Americans on 18 May. Elements of Army Group Centre continued to resist the overwhelming force of the Red Army invading Czechoslovakia during the final Prague Offensive. Units of Army Group Centre, the last big German units to surrender, capitulated on 11 May 1945.

Post-war trials and convictions
With the war over, Generalfeldmarschall Schörner handed himself in to the Americans on 18 May 1945, who a few weeks later passed him over to the Soviet authorities as a prisoner of war. In August 1951 he was charged with war crimes, and in February 1952 the Military Board of the Soviet Supreme Court sentenced him to 25 years imprisonment. A decree of the Presidium of the Supreme Soviet in April 1952 reduced this sentence to 12 and a half years. A decree of December 1954 allowed him to be handed over to authorities of East Germany, and he was released in 1955. Returning to West Germany, he was arrested and charged with executions of German Army soldiers accused of desertion. Schörner was found guilty of manslaughter and attempted manslaughter and sentenced to four and a half years in prison. He was released on 4 August 1960 and lived in obscurity in Munich until his death in 1973. At the time of his death, he was the last surviving field marshal of the Third Reich. In the late 1960s, he gave a lengthy interview to Italian historian Mario Silvestri on his role and actions during the Austro-German victory at the Battle of Caporetto in World War I, but rarely spoke about his World War II service.

Assessment
German veterans particularly criticized Schörner for a 1945 order that all soldiers found behind the front lines, who did not possess written orders to be there, were to be court-martialled on the spot and hanged if found guilty of desertion. This is mentioned in the writings of Siegfried Knappe, Hans von Luck and Joseph Goebbels. "Deserters get no mercy from him" Goebbels wrote of Schörner on 11 March 1945. "They are hanged from the nearest tree with a placard round their necks saying 'I am a deserter. I have declined to defend German women and children and therefore I have been hanged'". ("Ich bin ein Deserteur. Ich habe mich geweigert, deutsche Frauen und Kinder zu beschützen und bin deshalb aufgehängt worden.") Goebbels continued with, "Naturally such methods are effective. Every man in Schörner's area knows that he may die at the front but will inevitably die in the rear".

Gottlob Herbert Bidermann, a German infantry officer, of the 132nd Infantry Division, who served in Schörner's command in 1944–45, reported in his memoirs that the General was despised by officers and men alike.

Schörner was said to be devoted to Hitler, a view that is seen as confirmed by Hitler's appointment of Schörner as his replacement as Commander-in-Chief of the German Army on his suicide in the Last will and testament of Adolf Hitler. Schörner did not hesitate to second Hitler's fantasy in the last weeks of the war, agreeing that the Red Army's main objective would be Prague instead of Berlin (in itself a colossal strategic blunder) and so leading him to weaken the critically thin defense lines in front of Berlin. Historian Ian Kershaw described him in 2011 (BBC History Magazine) as "extraordinarily brutal".

In The End (2012) Kershaw describes Schörner as "a fanatical (Nazi) loyalist", an indication of this being that he had served for a brief spell in March 1944 as Chief of the NS Leadership Staff of the Army. The latter was responsible for coordinating relations between the military and the Nazi Party.

Promotions
Gefreiter: 1 April 1912
Unteroffizier: 1 August 1912
Vize-Feldwebel (der Reserve): 22 May 1913
Offiziers-Stellvertreter: 28 August 1914
Leutnant (der Reserve der Infanterie): 29 November 1914
Oberleutnant: 15 July 1918
Hauptmann: 1 August 1926
Major: 14 August 1934
Oberstleutnant: 16 March 1937
Oberst: 27 August 1939
Generalmajor: 17 December 1941
Generalleutnant: 28 February 1942
General der Gebirgstruppe: 15 May 1942
Generaloberst: 20 May 1944
Generalfeldmarschall: 5 April 1945

Awards and decorations
 Iron Cross (1914) 2nd Class (22 December 1914) & 1st Class (27 January 1917)
 Pour le Mérite (5 December 1917)
 Military Merit Cross, 3rd class with War Decoration (Austria-Hungary, 20 April 1916)
 Military Merit Order, 4th class with Swords and Crown (Bavaria, 24 October 1917)
 Clasp to the Iron Cross (1939) 2nd Class (12 September 1939) and 1st Class (20 September 1939)
 Eastern Front Medal (20 August 1942)
 Golden Party Badge of the NSDAP (30 January 1943)
 Order of the Cross of Liberty 1st Class (Finland, 1 July 1942)
 Knight's Cross of the Iron Cross with Oak Leaves, Swords and Diamonds
 Knight's Cross on 20 April 1941 as Generalmajor and commander of 6. Gebirgs-Division
 398th Oak Leaves on 17 February 1944 as General der Gebirgstruppe and commander of XXXX. Panzerkorps
 93rd Swords on 28 August 1944 as Generaloberst and commander-in-chief of Heeresgruppe Nord
 23rd Diamonds on 1 January 1945 as Generaloberst and commander-in-chief of Heeresgruppe Nord

Notes

References

Citations

Bibliography

External links

 
 
 

1892 births
1973 deaths
Burials in Bavaria
German Army World War II field marshals
German Army personnel of World War I
Military personnel from Munich
People from the Kingdom of Bavaria
Recipients of the clasp to the Iron Cross, 1st class
Recipients of the Knight's Cross of the Iron Cross with Oak Leaves, Swords and Diamonds
Recipients of the Order of the Cross of Liberty, 1st Class
Recipients of the Pour le Mérite (military class)
German prisoners of war in World War II held by the Soviet Union
Inmates of Vladimir Central Prison
20th-century Freikorps personnel
Nazis convicted of war crimes
German people convicted of manslaughter